Stephan Micus (born 19 January 1953) is a German musician and composer, whose musical style is heavily influenced by his study of traditional instruments and musical techniques from Japan, India, South America, and other countries. With the exception of his album The Music of Stones (1989), he plays all the instruments on his recordings, combining styles from different countries and using the instruments in unprecedented ways in each of his pieces. He often uses layers of a single instrument to create unusual combinations of sounds. He is one of the few ECM Records artists whose records are not produced by Manfred Eicher. He has mixed instruments from around the world, or used whatever was at hand: stones, ordinary flowerpots tuned with water, and his voice—singing improvised syllables over ten years before others made this approach fashionable.

Micus has played bagpipes, Japanese bamboo flute, rabab, steel drums, and zither.

Discography
 1976 - Archaic Concerts (Caroline/Virgin)
 1977 - Implosions (Japo/ECM)
 1978 - Behind Eleven Deserts (Wind)
 1978 – Till the End of Time (Japo/ECM)
 1981 - Koan (Japo/ECM) (recorded in 1977)
 1982 – Wings over Water (Japo/ECM)
 1983 – Listen to the Rain (Japo/ECM)
 1985 – East of the Night (Japo/ECM)
 1986 – Ocean (ECM)
 1987 – Twilight Fields (ECM)
 1989 – The Music of Stones (ECM)
 1990 – Darkness and Light (ECM)
 1992 – To the Evening Child (ECM)
 1994 – Athos (ECM)
 1997 – The Garden of Mirrors (ECM)
 2001 – Desert Poems (ECM)
 2002 – Towards the Wind (ECM)
 2004 – Life (ECM)
 2006 – On the Wing (ECM)
 2008 – Snow (ECM)
 2010 – Bold as Light (ECM)
 2013 – Panagia (ECM)
 2015 – Nomad Songs (ECM)
 2017 – Inland Sea (ECM)
 2019 – White night (ECM)
 2021 – Winter's End (ECM)
 2023 - Thunder (ECM)

References

External links
 Biography from ECM
 Stephan Micus page on ECM
 Stephan Micus: Solitary Pursuits (interviews)

1953 births
Living people
Caroline Records artists
German composers
ECM Records artists
Shō players
Tin whistle players